17 Super Exitos is a compilation of Selena's hits released in 1993 by EMI Latin.

Track listing
"Como La Flor"
"Mentiras"
"Que creias"
"Besitos"
"Yo Fui Aquella"
"Despues De Enero"
"Vuelve A Mi"
"No Quiero Saber"
"Costumbres"
"Tengo Ganas De Llorar"
"Baila Esta Cumbia"
"Yo Me Voy"
"La Carcacha"
"Tú eres"
"Sukiyaki"
"Estoy Contigo"
"La Tracalera"

Charts

Weekly charts

Certifications

References

1993 greatest hits albums
Selena compilation albums
Spanish-language compilation albums
EMI Records compilation albums
Albums produced by A.B. Quintanilla